Mattox is a surname. Notable people with the surname include:

Bain Mattox, American musician
Bernadette Mattox, American basketball coach
Cloy Mattox (1902–1985), American baseball player
Jim Mattox (1943–2008), American lawyer and politician
Jim Mattox (baseball) (1896–1973), American baseball player
Jon Mattox, American composer
Kenneth Mattox (born c. 1938), American surgeon
Martha Mattox (1879–1933), American actress
Marv Mattox, American football player
Matt Mattox (1922–2013), American jazz and ballet dancer
Ray Mattox (1927–2005), American politician

See also
Mattox Bastion, mountain of Antarctica
Mattox Creek, river in Virginia, United States